Royal George Hotel may refer to:

Australia
 Royal George Hotel, Albany, Western Australia
 Royal George Hotel, Sydney
 Royal George Hotel and Ruddle's Building, Brisbane, Queensland

United Kingdom
 Royal George Hotel, Perth, Scotland
 Royal George Hotel, Monmouth, Wales
 Royal George Hotel, Tintern, Wales